Alex Bank is an Australian digital bank. It is based in Brisbane, Queensland.

The company was founded in 2018 by Simon Beitz and Craig Fenwick. It was granted a restricted authorised deposit-taking institution licence by the Australian Prudential Regulation Authority in July 2021. In December 2022 the Australian Prudential Regulation Authority announced that it had granted the Bank its full authroised deposit-taking licence.

History

Alex Bank was established in 2018 by two ex-Suncorp executives, Simon Beitz and Craig Fenwick. At its founding, Beitz was named Chief executive officer and Fenwick Chief financial officer. The bank initially targeted 18-to-30 year-olds in the autumn of 2020, with the idea that they are more comfortable with the idea of a fully-digital bank. 

The company launched its banking services late in 2020 after a trial period in 2019. In July 2021, Alex Bank was granted a restricted authorised deposit-taking institution licence by the Australian Prudential Regulation Authority. The licence permitted the company to take deposits of up to $250,000 AUD from public borrowers, but placed limitations on the range of products and services it could offer. Alex Bank was one of only two Australian financial institutions to be granted a restricted authorised deposit-taking institution licence at the time.

The bank had raised approximately $55 million AUD in capital as of September 2021, chiefly from private (mostly Australian) investors.

In December 2022 the Australian Prudential Regulation Authority announced that it had granted Alex Bank its authroised deposit-taking licence.

Products
The bank provides short term personal loans to individual borrowers.  The company differentiated itself from other banks by waiving establishment fees, ongoing fees, payout penalties or extra-repayment fees on its loans.

References

Banks of Australia
Neobanks
Australian companies established in 2018
Companies based in Brisbane